The Haas VF-23 is a race car built by Haas F1 Team competing in the 2023 Formula One World Championship. In December 2022, the car became the first of the 2023 models to pass FIA homologation. The VF-23 is driven by Kevin Magnussen for his second consecutive year with the team, having also raced for them from 2017 to 2020 and Nico Hülkenberg, who returned to Formula One in 2023 after 3 years without a full-time race contract.

Livery 
Haas revealed the livery of the car on January 31, 2023. The livery integrates the branding of MoneyGram International Inc., the team's third title sponsor after Rich Energy and Uralkali, which was first announced at the 2022 United States Grand Prix. Furthermore, the team announced a partnership with Chipotle Mexican Grill ahead of the 2023 championship on February 16, 2023. During the three American Grands Prix - Miami, Austin and Las Vegas - the Chipotle Mexican Grill logo will featured on both the nose and side of the VF-23.

The livery is colored in red, white and black, all key colors for both team title sponsor MoneyGram and the MoneyGram Haas F1 Team, and the first time Haas had utilized a predominantly dark color scheme for their car since the Haas VF-19.

Complete Formula One results
(key)

* Season still in progress.

References 

VF-23
2023 Formula One season cars